Bohušov (until 1950 Fulštejn) is a municipality and village in Bruntál District in the Moravian-Silesian Region of the Czech Republic. It has about 400 inhabitants.

Administrative parts
Villages of Dolní Povelice, Karlov and Ostrá Hora are administrative parts of Bohušov.

Geography
The municipality is located on the border with Poland in the Osoblažsko microregion.

Bohušov is situated in the Zlatohorská Highlands. The Osoblaha River flows across the municipality. There are several ponds, the largest of them are Bohušovský and Pod hradem.

History

The first written mention of Bohušov is from 1255. It was one of the settlements that were founded in the area shortly before at the initiative of the bishop Bruno von Schauenburg. The area was then settled by German colonizers. Knight Herbort of Fulme had a castle called Fullstein built here, and Bohušov, that time called Gottfriedsdorf, was a group of hamlets that was formed in the castle grounds.

During the Hussite Wars, the area was devastated. In 1570, the Fullstein estate was acquired by the Sedlnický family and the village of Gottfriedsdorf was renamed Fullstein. In 1649, the castle was conquered and severely damaged by the Swedish troops.

In 1938, Bohušov was annexed by Nazi Germany and administered as a part of Reichsgau Sudetenland. After the World War II, the German population was expelled and the village was resettled by Czechs.

Economy
Bohušov is a tourist destination. At the pond Pod hradem there is a recreational area with a camp.

Transport

Bohušov lies on the narrow-gauge Třemešná ve Slezsku – Osoblaha Railway. There are two stops in the municipality: Bohušov and Koberno.

Sights
The Fulštejn castle ruin is the landmark of Bohušov. It is located on a wooded hill above the river Osoblaha. The ruin is freely accessible.

The parish Church of Saint Martin was built shortly after 1255. The originally Gothic building was later baroque modified. After the fire in 1800, it was reconstructed into its current form.

The narrow-gauge railway serves not only for transport but also as a tourist attraction. Steam trains run on weekends during the tourist season.

References

External links

Villages in Bruntál District